I-64 was an Imperial Japanese Navy  cruiser submarine of the KD4 sub-class commissioned in 1930. During World War II, she supported the Japanese invasion of Malaya and conducted war patrols in the Indian Ocean before she was sunk in May 1942 while deploying to take part in the upcoming Battle of Midway. Just after her loss, and before her loss became known to the Japanese, she was renumbered .

Construction and commissioning
Built by the Kure Naval Arsenal at Kure, Japan, I-64 was laid down on 28 March 1927 and launched on 5 October 1929. She was completed and accepted into Imperial Japanese Navy service on 30 August 1930.

Service history

Pre-World War II
Upon commissioning, I-64 was attached to the Sasebo Naval District and assigned to Submarine Division 29, in which she served until 1942 alongside the submarines  and I-62. Submarine Division 29 in turn was assigned to Submarine Squadron 1 in the 1st Fleet, a component of the Combined Fleet, on 1 December 1930. Submarine Division 29 was reassigned to the Sasebo Defense Division in the Sasebo Naval District on 10 November 1932. On 15 November 1933, Submarine Division 29 was reassigned to Submarine Squadron 2 in the 2nd Fleet, also a component of the Combined Fleet.

The nine submarines completed the cruise with their arrival at Sasebo on 5 October 1934. On 7 February 1935, I-64 departed Sasebo in company with the other eight submarines of Submarine Squadron 2 — I-53, I-54, I-55, I-59, I-61,  I-62, and  — for a training cruise in the Kuril Islands. The cruise concluded with their arrival at Sukumo Bay on 25 February 1935.

Submarine Division 29 had a second assignment to the Sasebo Defense Division in the Sasebo Naval District from 15 November 1935 to 1 December 1936, then again had duty in Submarine Squadron 2 in the 2nd Fleet in the Combined Fleet from 1 December 1936 to 15 December 1938. Submarine Division 29 then served at the submarine school at Kure, Japan, from 15 December 1938 to 15 November 1939, when I-64 was placed in the Third Reserve in the Sasebo Naval District. When I-64 was recommissioned on 15 November 1940, Submarine Division 29 was reassigned to Submarine Squadron 5 in the Combined Fleet.

As the Imperial Japanese Navy began to deploy in preparation for the impending conflict in the Pacific, Submarine Division 29, still made up of I-62 and I-64, departed Sasebo, Japan, on 26 November 1941 bound for Palau along with the rest of Submarine Squadron 5, namely the submarines of Submarine Division 30 and the squadron's flagship, the light cruiser . While en route, the entire squadron was diverted to Samah on Hainan Island in China.

World War II

First war patrol
On 5 December 1941, I-64 departed Samah to begin what would become her first war patrol. Reassigned to Patrol Unit "B" on 26 December 1941, she concluded her patrol by arriving at Cam Ranh Bay in Japanese-occupied French Indochina on 27 December 1941.

Second war patrol
As a unit of Patrol Group "B," I-64 was among submarines tasked with attacking Allied shipping in the Indian Ocean west of the 106th meridian east, operating from a new base at newly captured Penang in Japanese-occupied British Malaya. Accordingly, on 7 January 1942 I-64 departed Cam Ranh Bay to begin her second war patrol. After one torpedo passed ahead of Van Overstraten and one passed under her keel, leaving her undamaged, I-64 surfaced and opened fire on Van Overstraten with her deck gun. She scored a number of hits, slowing Van Overstraten and killing four members of her crew. Van Overstraten stopped and her surviving crew abandoned ship in her lifeboats. There were 113 survivors.

At 05:47 GMT on 28 January 1942, I-64 surfaced in the Palk Strait north of Ceylon and opened fire with her deck gun on the 391-gross register ton British Inland Water Transport paddle steamer Idar, which was steaming from Madras to Cochin, India. I-64 sent a boarding party to Idar to set her on fire, but she survived and later drifted ashore. The torpedo hit blew a large hole in Florence Luckenbach′s port side at her No. 1 hold. Ten minutes later, Florence Luckenbach′s entire crew of 38 abandoned ship in her single surviving lifeboat.

At 22:33 on 30 January 1942, I-64 torpedoed the British-Indian 2,498-gross register ton merchant steamer Jalatarang — on a voyage from Cochin, India, to Rangoon, Burma, carrying 100 tons of general cargo — in the Bay of Bengal south of Madras, crippling her. Thirty-eight members of Jalatarang′s crew perished, and 11 eventually were rescued. Thirteen members of Jalapalaka′s crew died, and 54 later were rescued. I-64 finished her patrol with her arrival at Penang on 5 February 1942.

Third war patrol
On 6 March 1942, I-64 set out from Penang to begin her third war patrol, again targeting Allied shipping in the Indian Ocean. While she was at sea, Submarine Division 29 was disbanded on 10 March 1942 and she was reassigned to Submarine Division 30 in Submarine Squadron 5. After I-64 scored 12 hits on Mabella, killing six members of her crew, Mabella′s surviving crew abandoned ship in two lifeboats and a life raft. On 27 March 1942, I-64 returned to Penang.

April–May 1942
On 2 April 1942, I-64 departed Penang bound for Sasebo, where she arrived on 12 April 1942. On 16 May 1942 she departed Sasebo bound for Kwajalein, deploying to support Operation MI, the invasion of Midway Atoll planned for early June 1942.

Loss
The torpedo struck I-64, the explosion blowing parts of her  into the air. Triton′s crew heard a series of 42 smaller explosions beginning at 18:27. At 18:45, Triton′s commanding officer sighted an estimated 30 survivors clinging to wreckage in the water. Ultimately, none of them were rescued.

Unaware of I-64′s loss, the Imperial Japanese Navy renumbered her I-164 on 20 May 1942. On 25 May 1942, it declared her presumed missing in the Pacific Ocean south of Shikoku with the loss of all 81 hands. She was stricken from the Navy list on 10 July 1942.

Notes

References

1929 ships
Ships built by Kure Naval Arsenal
World War II submarines of Japan
Kaidai-class submarines
Maritime incidents in May 1942
World War II shipwrecks in the Pacific Ocean
Japanese submarines lost during World War II
Ships sunk by American submarines
Submarines sunk by submarines
Warships lost in combat with all hands